

Game 1

Game 2

Game 3

Game 4

Game 5

Game 6

Game 7

Game 8

Game 9

Game 10

Group A
2004–05 in Greek basketball
2004–05 in Belgian basketball
2004–05 in Serbian basketball
2004–05 in Hungarian basketball
2004–05 in French basketball
2004–05 in German basketball